Terrer is a municipality located in the province of Zaragoza, Aragon, Spain.

Population
According to the 2007 census (INE), the municipality has a population of 541 inhabitants.

It appears in the Cantar de Mio Cid.

References

Municipalities in the Province of Zaragoza